David Menefee-Libey is an American political scientist who has done research on the education policy of the United States. He is the William A. Johnson Professor of Government at Pomona College in Claremont, California.

Early life and education 
Menefee-Libey attended St. Olaf College and then earned a doctorate from the University of Chicago.

Career 
Menefee-Libey joined the Pomona College faculty in 1989.

In July 2022, he was appointed the William A. Johnson Professor of Government, an endowed chair.

Personal life 
Menefee-Libey lives in Claremont.

References

External links
Faculty page at Pomona College

Year of birth missing (living people)
Living people
Pomona College faculty
American political scientists
American educational theorists
St. Olaf College alumni
University of Chicago alumni